Israel participated in the Eurovision Song Contest 2002 in Tallinn. Sarit Hadad represented Israel with the song "Light a Candle" (Hebrew: "Nadlik Beyakhad Ner").

Before Eurovision

Internal selection 
On 26 November 2001, IBA announced that Sarit Hadad was selected by a special committee as the Israeli representative for the Eurovision Song Contest 2002. Among artists considered by the selection committee, Gaia and Zehava Ben were highly considered before Hadad was ultimately selected. Among the members of the committee were Aviva Avidan, Yigal Hared, Izhar Cohen, Haim Uliel, Amos Oren, Nava Achiron, Tal Gordon and Avihu Medina. Four songs were submitted by Hadad, which were subsequently evaluated by the committee that selected the song on 24 December 2001. "Nadlik Beyakhad Ner" was selected as the song that Hadad would represent Israel with in Tallinn and was revealed on 7 January 2002.

At Eurovision 
Israel scored 37 points, finishing 12th.

Voting

References

2002
Countries in the Eurovision Song Contest 2002
Eurovision